

Events
Frank Lyons, a member of the Yellow Henry Gang, escapes from prison and reorganizes the gang before being recaptured later that year. 
January 23 – Danny Driscoll, co-leader of the Whyos street gang, is executed for the death of New York prostitute Breezy Garrity during a gunfight between Driscoll and Five Points Gang member Johnny McCarthy.  
July 5 – Danny Lyons kills rival pimp Joseph Quinn in a gunfight over prostitute Kitty McGown.   
August 21 – Danny Lyons, leader of the Whyos street gang, is executed for the murder of Joseph Quinn.

Arts and literature

Births
January 21: Frank Nitti, underboss to Chicago crime boss Al Capone.
December 5: Anthony Milano, underboss in the Cleveland crime family
Joseph DiGiovanno, Kansas City La Mano Nera (The Black Hand) leader  
Vincent Mangano, Mangano crime family founder
Nathan Shefferman – Chicago Teamsters Union official and associate of Dave Beck 
Jack Zelig (William Alberts), New York gangster (although other sources claim 1882)

Deaths
January 23 – Danny Driscoll, co-leader of the Whyos street gang, is executed. 
July 5 – Joseph Quinn, New York pimp 
August 21 – Danny Lyons, leader of the Whyos street gang.

References

Years in organized crime
Organized crime